Nidoïsh Naisseline (born in Guahma on Maré Island, June 27, 1945 – died June 3, 2015 in Nouméa) was a New Caledonian politician. A Kanak of the Nétché tribe, born on the island of Maré, he was an advocate of New Caledonian independence.  He succeeded his father Henri as high chief of the Guahma district in 1973; on June 6, 2007, he abdicated in favour of his son, Dokucas.  

He had also served in the Congress of New Caledonia. He was the leader of the Kanak Socialist Liberation.

References

1945 births
2015 deaths
Kanak chiefs
Monarchs who abdicated
Members of the Congress of New Caledonia
New Caledonian socialists
People from the Loyalty Islands